Poovai Dr. M . Jagan Moorthy popularly known as Poovai Jagan Moorthy (born 10 May 1966) is an Indian politician and social activist of Tamilnadu. He is a Member of the Legislative Assembly from K. V. Kuppam of Tamil Nadu. He is the current President of the Puratchi Bharatham party(PBK). Puratchi Bharatham party (PBK) founder Dr.Poovai M.Moorthy died of a heart attack on September 2, 2002. After that, Jagan Moorthy became the president of the Puratchi Bharatham party(PBK) on September 7, 2002, with the unanimous support of many senior party executives.

He rose as a powerful revolutionary leader among Dalits of Tamilnadu. His political policy and foundation is to eliminate caste and religion discrimination in the society. His political platform believes on the principle that education only can enlighten the social structure.

In 2006, He made alliance with DMK front and Contested in Tamil Nadu legislative assembly for Arakkonam constituency and won in 2006 election. He and his party supported AIADMK in the 2016 Tamil Nadu Legislative Assembly election. He continued his alliance with AIADMK in 2021 Tamilnadu Elections and He contested in K. V. Kuppam constituency of Tamil Nadu and won in 2021 elections.

He is an equality leader who speaks for the welfare of not only the Dalits but also for the Tamil people. He had many protests for the welfare of students and people of Tamilnadu.

Electoral performance

References 

Living people
Tamil Nadu MLAs 2021–2026
1966 births